The 1904 Arkansas Cardinals football team represented the University of Arkansas during the 1904 college football season. In their first season under head coach Ancil D. Brown (a former player and coach at Syracuse), the Razorbacks compiled a 4–3 record and were outscored by their opponents by a combined total of 133 to 68.

Schedule

References

Arkansas
Arkansas Razorbacks football seasons
Arkansas Cardinals football